Brian Mitchell may refer to:

Sports
Bryan Mitchell (born 1991), American professional baseball pitcher
Brian Mitchell (boxer) (born 1961), former professional boxer
Brian Mitchell (kicker) (born 1969), college football player, Marshall University in 1987, University of Northern Iowa 1989–1991
Brian Mitchell (running back) (born 1968), former American football running back and return specialist
Brian Mitchell (American football coach) (born 1968), American football coach and former cornerback
Brian Mitchell (cricketer) (born 1959), Australian cricketer
Brian Mitchell (footballer) (born 1963), Scottish former professional footballer

Arts and entertainment
Brian Mitchell (musician), keyboard and accordion player, Brian Mitchell Band
Brian Stokes Mitchell (born 1957), actor
Brian Mitchell and Joseph Nixon, British comedy writing team

Other
Brian C. Mitchell (born 1953), president of Bucknell University
Brian David Mitchell (born 1953), perpetrator of the Elizabeth Smart kidnapping
Brian Mitchell (politician) (born 1967), Australian politician
Brian Patrick Mitchell, American writer and political theorist